The NCR National Championships are the national championship tournaments sponsored by National Collegiate Rugby (NCR, formerly National Small College Rugby Organization) for men's and women's college rugby in both 15s and 7s rugby.

NSCRO rebranded as NCR in 2020, when it expanded its mission and reach by offering membership and organizing championships for larger colleges playing in upper divisions. Prior to this NSCRO sponsored four regional tournaments: New England, New York/Midwest, Mid-Atlantic, and South. The regional champions were invited to compete in the annual "Fearsome Four" to determine the NSCRO National Champions.

Championships included:
 Men's 15s Champions Cup 
 Men's 15s Challenge Cup
 Women's 15s Nationals 
 Men's 7s Nationals    
 Women's 7s Nationals

History 
From 2002 to 2006 for Men's 15s, and from 2003 to 2006 for Women's 15s, the event name was "East Coast Division 3 Collegiate Championship". In 2007, the events were renamed to "NSCRO Men's Collegiate Division 3 National Championship", "NSCRO Women's Collegiate Division 3 National Championship" and "NSCRO Women's Collegiate Division 4 National Championship". In August 2012, Small College Championship nomenclature replaced Division 3, and since Fall 2012, the "Women's D4 Championship" was discontinued.

In 2015, NSCRO inaugurated the lower-level Men's Challenge Cup Championship.

Champions

Men

Women

See also
 College rugby
 Intercollegiate sports team champions

References

External links
 

NSCRO Championships